The St. James Cathedral  also called Valparaíso Cathedral is a cathedral church of Catholic worship, seat of the Diocese of Valparaíso, in Chile. It is located in El Almendral neighborhood, on the east side of the Plaza de la Victoria and on the flat land of the city.

Currently, the church also serves as parish church for the Holy Spirit Parish, whose former religious centre also faced the square but was built on another site. The wedding of Captain Arturo Prat and Carmela Carvajal was celebrated at the former church.

The church building, Gothic in style, was built from 1910 to 1950 on land donated by Juana Ross Edwards. It was restored after the earthquakes of 1971 and 1985.

See also
Roman Catholicism in Chile

References

Roman Catholic cathedrals in Chile
Buildings and structures in Valparaíso
Roman Catholic churches completed in 1950
20th-century Roman Catholic church buildings in Chile